Nadine Caster (born 15 October   1965 at François) is a French athlete, who specializes in the Long jump.

Biography  
Nadine won four  French national titles in the long jump: 1994,  1995,  1996 and 2004. On 25 June 1995, at Villeneuve d'AscqIt, Nadine established a new French long jump record with a jump of 6.94m, improving by 15 cm the former best national jump held since 1985 by Nadine Fourcade.

prize list  
 French Championships in Athletics   :  
 winner of the long jump 1994,  1995,  1996 and 2004.

Records

notes and references

External links  
 

1965 births
Living people
French female long jumpers